Bouaké Airport  is an airport located in Bouaké, the second largest city in Côte d'Ivoire, in West Africa.

Airlines and destinations

June 29, 2007 assassination attempt on Guillaume Soro

On June 29, 2007, Guillaume Soro, the prime minister of Côte d'Ivoire, was targeted by rocket and Kalashnikov fire upon his landing at the Bouaké Airport. Four people were killed and ten others wounded.

References

External links 
 Bouaké Airport (fallingrain.com)

Airports in Ivory Coast
Airport
Buildings and structures in Vallée du Bandama District